Azim Kazi (born 14 October 1993) is an Indian cricketer who represents Maharashtra in domestic cricket. He is a left-arm orthodox bowler and a left handed lower order batter. 

He made his Twenty20 debut for Maharashtra in the 2018–19 Syed Mushtaq Ali Trophy on 22 February 2019. He made his List A debut on 7 October 2019, for Maharashtra in the 2019–20 Vijay Hazare Trophy. He made his first-class debut on 9 December 2019, for Maharashtra in the 2019–20 Ranji Trophy.

References

External links
 

1993 births
Living people
Indian cricketers
Maharashtra cricketers
Place of birth missing (living people)